MAYAN Group Co. MAYAN Group is Iran's largest private software development company. The company provides enterprise software solutions and support to businesses of all sizes located across the country.

Activities 
The company's core business activities focus on providing:
 ERP solutions for medium and large size enterprises
 Public Sector solutions
 Business Intelligence solutions
 Solutions for distribution and retail industries
 Solutions for SMEs
 Training, implementation and technical support of software systems
 Advanced RFID enabled solution

References

 

2001 establishments in Iran